League of Communists of Croatia ( or SKH) was the Croatian branch of the League of Communists of Yugoslavia (SKJ). It came into power in 1945. Until 1952, it was known as Communist Party of Croatia (Komunistička partija Hrvatske, KPH). In the early 1990s, it underwent several renames and lost power.

History

Kingdom of Yugoslavia 
The party was formally founded in 1937 with Pavle Gregorić as its first general secretary. The reasons for KPJ to have its specifically Croatian branch were partly ideological, partly practical. Croatia, just as Slovenia, which would have its Communist Party at the same time, was the most industrialised part of the country, with the biggest percentage of working class in the population, and, therefore, more likely to adopt communism than rural Serbia.

The other, more practical, reason was in the increased marginalisation of Communists in Croatian political life due to public more preoccupied with ethnic issues and position of Croatia within Yugoslavia (cf. Croatia in the first Yugoslavia). Territorial aspirations of Fascist Italy towards Croatian parts of Yugoslavia also presented opportunity for the creation of broad Communist-dominated alliances modelled on Popular Front.

Prior to the formation of the Communist Party of Croatia there was a Croatian-Slavonian Provincial Committee of the Socialist Workers Party of Yugoslavia (Communists) and there was a developed party structure of the Socialist Party of Croatia and Slavonia. Dalmatia had its own structures up to 1937.

KPH, just like KPJ, was illegal and, therefore, remained marginalised, especially after the 1939 Cvetković–Maček Agreement and the creation of the banovina of Croatia within the Kingdom of Yugoslavia.

Party's fortunes dramatically changed with the 1941 Axis invasion of Yugoslavia and creation of the Independent State of Croatia.  At the beginning of the Axis occupation of Yugoslavia, Aleksandar Ranković was secretary of the Central Committee of the Communist Party of Croatia. Although KPH had many of its leading figures arrested and killed by new regime, it remained strong enough to form what would become the only truly effective resistance movement in Croatia – the Partisans. KPH was based on ideological rather than ethnic grounds and, therefore, had support in both ethnic Croat and ethnic Serb areas. This allowed Josip Broz Tito's Partisans to mount ultimately successful guerrilla campaign. KPH platform of post-war reorganisation of Yugoslavia on federal grounds also attracted many non-Communist Croatians to its cause, especially in the later stages of war.

SFR Yugoslavia 

In 1945 Yugoslavia was indeed federalised with Croatia becoming a republic, but its nominal autonomy was of little importance with KPJ being heavily centralised and KPH – renamed into SKH in 1952 – being its integral part.

Things began to change in late 1960s with Tito allowing for reformist policies embodied of new generation of Communist leaders. This generation included SKH leaders Savka Dabčević-Kučar and Miko Tripalo who would start movement called the Croatian Spring, advocating for more autonomy of Croatia within Yugoslavia. They advocated against centralism which disproportionately benefited the eastern parts of Yugoslavia, especially Serbia and Macedonia.

The movement, however, created a lot of ethnic tension and increasing opposition from the more conservative Party members. In December 1971, on the Karađorđevo conference of the SKJ, Tito publicly distanced himself from Croatian Spring, leading to the end of the movement. Using the alleged Croatian nationalism as a pretext, SKH was subsequently purged from most of its liberal and reformist elements.

As a result, SKH in the 1970s became one of the most conservative sections of SKJ and remained interested in maintaining ideological and political status quo even when other branches of SKJ began to explore new ideas.

Because of that, SKH in late 1980s was slow to react when League of Communists of Serbia under Slobodan Milošević aimed to reassert internal Serbian interest. SKH began to openly condemn Milošević only in 1989 after Serbian nationalist demonstrations in areas that would later become Republic of Serbian Krajina.

It is estimated that in the 1980s, during its zenith, the SKH had around 300-400,000 members. Subsequent surveys showed that most of the membership left the party in 1990, with only minority remaining active in politics. Of those, majority joined the HDZ.

Party of Democratic Changes 

With increasingly apparent prospect of SKH being forced to allow some form of multi-party democracy and having its power tested on free elections, the party changed policy and quickly adopted a new reformist platform and pushed for the constitutional amendments allowing first free elections in 1990.

In January 1990 the Croatian Party delegation led by Ivica Račan left the 14th Congress of SKJ, a few hours after the Slovenian Party delegation did so over a row with the Serbian Party delegation.

In the next few months, SKH tried very hard to present itself as modern and reformist party, rebranding itself into a new party called the League of Communists of Croatia - Party of Democratic Changes (Savez komunista Hrvatske - Stranka demokratskih promjena, SKH-SDP), then to just Party of Democratic Changes (Stranka demokratskih promjena, SDP).

Those and other changes, however, weren't very convincing to the Croatian electorate and SKH lost power to Croatian Democratic Union of Franjo Tuđman.

In 1991, it was renamed to Socialdemocratic Party of Croatia–Party of Democratic Changes (Socijaldemokratska partija Hrvatske–Stranka demokratskih promjena, SDPH), that would ultimately become the Social Democratic Party of Croatia in 1993.

Ethno-nationalist issues 

Another reason why the Party lost support in Croatia was because it was accused of being dominated by the Serb minority. The Serb influence was indeed disproportionate at times. In 1989, 30% of the members of the Croatian League of Communists were Serbs, while their overall percentage in the republic was less than 13%.

Serbs held the presidency of the party twice, one up to 1942 with Rade Končar, the other from 1986 until 1989 by Stanko Stojčević.

Ethnic composition of the governments 

Government of April 14, 1945
 5 Croats
 1 Serb
 8 members of unknown or undeclared ethnicity

Government of October 22, 1949
 13 Croats
 3 Serbs
 1 Yugoslav
 7 members of unknown or undeclared ethnicity

Executive Committee of February 7, 1953
 18 Croats
 3 Serbs
 3 members of unknown or undeclared ethnicity

Executive Committee Spring 1958
 16 Croats
 2 Serbs
 6 members of unknown or undeclared ethnicity

Executive Committee of 1963
 5 Croats
 6 members of unknown or undeclared ethnicity

Party leaders 

 Andrija Hebrang (1942 – October 1944) (1899–1949)
 Vladimir Bakarić (October 1944 – 1969) (1912–1983)
 Savka Dabčević-Kučar (1969–1971) (1923–2009)
 Milka Planinc (14 December 1971 – May 1982) (1924–2010)
 Jure Bilić (May 1982 – 1 July 1983) (1922–2006)
 Josip Vrhovec (1 July 1983 – 15 May 1984) (1926–2006)
 Mika Špiljak (15 May 1984 – May 1986) (1916–2007)
 Stanko Stojčević (May 1986 – December 1989) (1929-2009)
 Ivica Račan (13 December 1989 – 1990) (1944–2007)

Sources 
 Shoup, Paul. "Communism and the Yugoslav national question". New York: Columbia University Press, 1968. 308 p.
 Chapter 4, Government and Politics/Regional Political Issues/Croatia of the U.S. Library of Congress A country study of Yugoslavia

Revival 
On 29 November 2004 – the date specifically chosen as Republic Day, former public holiday in socialist Yugoslavia – a group of Socialist Labour Party of Croatia dissidents in Vukovar tried to found new political party called Communist Party of Croatia, but in the end they failed to register and organize. A new  was founded in 2013 and became a registered party in the same year.

This new party should not be mistaken with KPH/SKH, because, unlike Social Democratic Party of Croatia, it is not its formal successor.

See also 
 History of Croatia
 League of Communists of Yugoslavia
 League of Communists of Bosnia and Herzegovina
 League of Communists of Macedonia
 League of Communists of Montenegro
 League of Communists of Serbia
 League of Communists of Vojvodina
 League of Communists of Kosovo
 League of Communists of Slovenia
 List of leaders of communist Yugoslavia
 Socialist Federal Republic of Yugoslavia

References

Sources 
 

 
20th century in Croatia
Defunct political parties in Croatia
Communist parties in Croatia
Political parties established in 1937
Political parties disestablished in 1990
Parties of one-party systems
1937 establishments in Croatia
1990 disestablishments in Croatia
League of Communists of Yugoslavia